Yevgeni Vladimirovich Belosheikin (Евгений Белошейкин) (April 17, 1966 – November 18, 1999) was a professional ice hockey player who played in the Soviet Hockey League.  He played for the HC CSKA Moscow and SKA Leningrad.  He also played on the Soviet Union's 1987 Canada Cup and Rendez-vous '87 teams. He was nicknamed "Evgeny the Great" and was touted as the next Vladislav Tretiak – and had even been tutored by Tretiak and wore his number 20, though their styles bore little resemblance.

In 1986 Belosheikin was named the outstanding goaltender of the 1986 IIHF World U20 Championships in Hamilton, Canada. During the tournament the U.S.S.R went undefeated, winning 7 games and surrendering only 14 goals. A year later he was also named the outstanding goaltender in the 1987 Calgary Cup, a pre-olympic tournament that took place just before the 1987 Canada Cup. On New Year's Eve 1986, Belosheikin led the Soviets to a 4-1 win over Canada. Belosheikin would end his international career on February 2, 1988 with a 4-1 win in an exhibition game against Finland.

Though he was considered the heir apparent to Vladislav Tretiak as the next great Soviet goaltender, Belosheikin suffered problems with alcoholism.  After being drugged and robbed after a night of drinking with teammate Alexei Gusarov, he suffered liver and vision problems, which hastened the end of his career. In 1991 the Edmonton Oilers selected him in the 11th round, 232nd overall in the NHL Entry Draft, though Belosheikin reported to camp that year, he was immediately sent to the Oilers Cape Breton affiliate where he played only 3 games. Belosheikin never did play a game in the NHL.

Belosheikin committed suicide on November 18, 1999.

References

External links
 
 http://www.peoples.ru/sport/hockey/evgeniy_belosheikin/
 Information about his place of birth in Russian

1966 births
1999 suicides
Cape Breton Oilers players
Edmonton Oilers draft picks
HC CSKA Moscow players
Ice hockey players at the 1988 Winter Olympics
Olympic gold medalists for the Soviet Union
Olympic ice hockey players of the Soviet Union
People from Sakhalin Oblast
Russian ice hockey goaltenders
SKA Saint Petersburg players
Soviet ice hockey goaltenders
Suicides by hanging in Russia
Burials at Bogoslovskoe Cemetery
Sportspeople from Sakhalin Oblast